Dren is a village situated in Lazarevac municipality in Serbia.

References

Suburbs of Belgrade
Lazarevac